Unirea Câmpina was a Romanian professional football club from Câmpina, Prahova County, founded in 2003 and dissolved in 2013.

History
In the 2011–12 season, Unirea Câmpina , with Costin Plăvache on the bench, won Liga IV Prahova  and promoted to Liga III after a play-off match with FC Chitila, won with the score of 2–1. The squad that achieved the promotion was composed of: : Daniel Șandru – Zecheru, Neagu, Bogdan Șandru, I. Filip, A. Stoica, G. Bărăgan, Lambă, L. Cernea, Ed. Bica, A. Ciobanu. Reserves: Ionescu – Coman, Nichifor, Dobrescu, Fl. Stoica, Ghiță, Singureanu.

In the next season of the Liga III, 2012–13, the team went to the 3rd place, but in the summer of 2013, the team was disbanded for lack of funds.

Honours
Liga IV – Prahova County
Winners (1): 2011–12

League history

Former players
 Bogdan Șandru

Former managers
 Costin Plăvache
 Florin Stăncioiu
 Marius Pălănceanu

References

External links

Association football clubs established in 2004
Association football clubs disestablished in 2013
Defunct football clubs in Romania
Football clubs in Prahova County
Liga III clubs
Liga IV clubs
2004 establishments in Romania
Câmpina